, the Gerontology Research Group (GRG) had validated the longevity claims of 59 German citizens who have become "supercentenarians", attaining or surpassing 110 years of age. 49 of these were German residents and 10 were emigrants. There are currently at least four Germans known to be alive over age 110. The oldest of them is Charlotte Kretschmann, born on 3 December 1909, aged . Augusta Holtz, an emigrant to the United States, remains the oldest German citizen whose age has been verified: she lived 115 years, 79 days, from 1871 to 1986.

100 oldest Germans

Biographies

Friedrich Wedeking 
Karl Friedrich Wedeking (10 October 1862 – 5 May 1973) was born in Blomberg, Prussia, German Confederation, and died in Dortmund, West Germany, aged 110 years, 207 days. He was one of the founding members of the city's gliders club in 1931. Wedeking was the first supercentenarian recognized as the world's oldest living man by Guinness World Records.

Maria Laqua 
Maria Laqua (12 February 1889 – 9 February 2002) was born in Rheydt-Odenkirchen, North Rhine-Westphalia, as one of 13 children. She worked as a housemaid, got married, and gave birth to two sons in the 1920s, who both died in the Second World War. Her husband Charles died in 1958. She lived for 35 years in a retirement home in Bad Hönningen, Rhineland-Palatinate and died in her sleep. She was only survived by a great-niece who attended her regularly. Laqua was in need of care, bedridden and inaccessible during her last years, although she occasionally had a flash and spoke. She was the oldest person ever in Germany when she died aged 112 years, 362 days. Her record age was officially surpassed by Josefine Ollmann on 9 November 2021, who was validated by the GRG on 13 February 2023.

Hermann Dörnemann 
Hermann Dörnemann (27 May 1893 – 2 March 2005) was, at the time of his death, the oldest living person in Germany and the oldest living man in Europe for about one year. After the death of 113-year-old American, Fred H. Hale Sr., in November 2004, Dörnemann was believed to have become the world's oldest living man, but Emiliano Mercado del Toro from Puerto Rico was later confirmed to be almost two years older. Dörnemann credited his longevity to "drinking a beer a day". He died of pneumonia in Düsseldorf, aged 111 years, 279 days.

Elisabeth Schneider 
Elisabeth Schneider (19 August 1901 – 9 February 2013) was the oldest living person in Germany from November 2011 to her death in February 2013, aged 111 years and 174 days. She was born in Bad Oeynhausen, North Rhine-Westphalia, and had two sisters. She married in 1923 and gave birth to a daughter two years later. Schneider lived on her own until the age of 97. At her 111th birthday she was asked for the secret of her longevity and replied laughing that others just would have given up gasping for breath. She died in a retirement home in Varel, Lower Saxony. She was survived by her daughter, two grandchildren and four great-grandchildren.

Gertrud Henze 
Gertrud Henze (8 December 1901 – 22 April 2014) was the oldest living person in Germany from February 2013 until her death in April 2014. She was born in Rügen, worked as a librarian, and never married nor had children. Since 1993, she lived in a retirement home in Göttingen, where she was appreciated for her open and life-affirming attitude. She was still in good health, and listed reasons for her longevity including: reading a lot, having lively contact with other people, sometimes enjoying a cigarette and a glass of wine, and never getting married. She celebrated her 112th birthday only with some friends and relatives, because the public interest in her prior birthday had been too exhausting. She enjoyed reading, with the help of a magnifying glass. She was still able to walk with a rollator to meet acquaintances and friends for a chat. Henze died at the age of 112 years and 135 days. She donated her body to medical science for genetic research.

Frieda Szwillus 
Frieda Szwillus (née Hennig; 30 March 1902 – 21 September 2014) was Germany's oldest living person from April 2014 until her death five months later, aged 112 years, 175 days. She was born Frieda Hennig in Dessau (now in Saxony-Anhalt), and had six siblings. Her family moved to Erla when she was 6. She was married twice, raised one biological child and three stepchildren, and outlived all of them. Until her later years, Szwillus lived at home in Raschau with her family, and she needed no medicine. She was in good physical condition, but suffered from dementia. She had only been physically active during her youth. Her family attributed her longevity to a lively family life. She often visited her siblings, but never went on holiday. She also enjoyed knitting and embroidering. She died at the age of 112 years and 175 days.

Gustav Gerneth 
Gustav Gerneth (15 October 1905 – 21 October 2019) was born in Stettin, German Empire (now Szczecin, Poland). He worked in a shipping company and at a gas plant. During the Second World War, he was a mechanic in the German air force (Luftwaffe). He married Charlotte Grubert in 1930 and the couple had three sons; she died in 1988. Gerneth lived in Havelberg in Saxony-Anhalt for over forty years, and continued to do so on his own, with family members caring for his household. According to a statement by his granddaughter on his 113th birthday, he still had a lucid mind, watching football, solving crosswords, and doing mental arithmetic. Asked for the reason for his long life, he said: "I have always been living and eating well. No diet. Always butter, never margarine. I have not touched any cigarette all my life and I drank alcohol only at celebrations." Gerneth died on 21 October 2019 of natural causes, aged 114 years and 6 days, believed to have been the world's oldest man, although Guinness World Records has not verified his case.

Josefine Ollmann 

In November 2021, Josefine Ollmann (11 November 1908 – 16 July 2022) surpassed Maria Laqua's final age to become the oldest person ever in Germany and the first German to officially reach the age of 113. Ollmann, whose age was validated by the GRG on 13 February 2023, passed away on 16 July 2022 at the final age of 113 years and 247 days. Although Gustav Gerneth's claimed final age is older than Ollmann, his age is officially still unvalidated.

Notes

References 

 
German
Supercentenarians